In mathematics, an exposed point of a convex set  is a point  at which some continuous linear functional attains its strict maximum over . Such a functional is then said to expose .

Mathematical analysis
Convex geometry
Functional analysis